Kerstin Knüpfer née Mühlner (born 12 April 1963) is a German handball player. She participated at the 1992 Summer Olympics, where the German national team placed fourth.

She played for BSV Sachsen Zwickau , SC Leipzig and VfB Leipzig and won national and international titles with these clubs.

She played 210 international matches for the GDR women's national handball team and the German national women's handball team , in which she scored 426 goals. She was third with the GDR selection at the 1990 World Cup. With the German team she took fourth place at the 1992 Olympics and won the silver medal at the 1994 European Championships.

After graduating from high school, Kerstin Knüpfer studied sport at the German University for Physical Culture in Leipzig .

Notes

References 
 Profile at sports-reference.com

1963 births
Living people
People from Zwickau
People from Bezirk Karl-Marx-Stadt
German female handball players
Sportspeople from Saxony
Olympic handball players of Germany
Handball players at the 1992 Summer Olympics
20th-century German women